Hema Premadasa (née Wickramatunge) (born 27 October 1934) is a former First Lady of Sri Lanka. She was in the office of the first lady of Sri Lanka from 2 January 1989 to 1 May 1993. While she was married to a politician, she "carved a separate identity for herself through her Presidentship of the Seva Vanitha Movement." 

Premadasa is the mother of Sajith Premadasa (b 1967), Leader of the Opposition, and leader of the Samagi Jana Balawegaya. In 1991, even though the Sri Lankan government tried to ban the Mothers' Front rally, Premadasa held her own rally the same day. Later, she attempted to seek Presidency. She was forced to quit when the opposite party ran a "scurrilous poster campaign."

As first lady, she visited accident sites and hospitals when Sri Lankans were injured. She was also a member of the Seva Vanitha Movement (SVM). Premadasa's husband Ranasinghe Premadasa was killed by a LTTE bomb in 1993.

Premadasa is a fan of netball and considered an "ardent player."

References

Living people
First ladies and gentlemen of Sri Lanka
1935 births
Hema